Stein Erik Gullikstad (born 6 February 1952) is a Norwegian Nordic combined skier. He was born in Røros, and represented the club Røros IL. He competed at the 1976 Winter Olympics in Innsbruck, where he placed 22nd.

References

External links

1952 births
Living people
People from Røros
Norwegian male Nordic combined skiers
Olympic Nordic combined skiers of Norway
Nordic combined skiers at the 1976 Winter Olympics
Sportspeople from Trøndelag
20th-century Norwegian people